Limnaecia melanoma is a moth in the family Cosmopterigidae. It is found in Australia, where it has been recorded from Victoria.

The forewings white and the hindwings are fuscous.

References

Natural History Museum Lepidoptera generic names catalog

Limnaecia
Moths of Australia
Moths described in 1897